State of Origin results and statistics have been accumulating since the 1980 State of Origin game. Every game played under State of Origin selection rules, including the additional 1987 exhibition match and the matches played between New South Wales and Queensland for the Super League Tri-series are detailed below unless stated otherwise.

Results

Series matches

Queensland have won 22 series. NSW have won 16. On 2 occasion have both teams drawn a series (1999, 2002). (As of 2021)

One off matches
The matches in 1980 and 1981 were one off experimental matches after New South Wales had already won the interstate series in both years. Both games count toward official statistics, but are not considered series.

After Queensland had won the 1987 State of Origin series 2–1, a further game was played in Long Beach, California to showcase rugby league to the American public. On 15 July 2003 the Australian Rugby League announced that this game was to be classified as an "official match" and that the match would count towards the players' individual statistics and overall match win–loss–draw records. However, the match does not count towards the series win–loss–draw record and the 1987 series still remains a 2–1 win to Queensland.

Super League

New South Wales and Queensland played two matches against each other under State of Origin selection rules using players from the Super League (Australia) competition. These matches were not sanctioned by the Australian Rugby League and are not counted as official State of Origin series matches. The Tri-series also included both sides playing a game against New Zealand.

Statistics

Series
 Earliest start: 3 May (1993)
 Latest finish: 18 November (2020)
 Largest aggregate crowd: 224,135 (2015)
 With 2 games in Queensland: 187,374 (2005)
 Smallest Crowd: 67,003 (1982)
 Series Won by QLD: 22
 Series Won by NSW: 16
 Series Drawn:    2

Matches
 Largest crowd: 91,513 at Melbourne Cricket Ground (Match 2, 2015)
 Smallest crowd: 16,559 at Lang Park (match 3, 1984), 12,439 at Veteran's Stadium, Los Angeles, USA (1987)
 Most points scored: 72, New South Wales d. Queensland 56–16 (match 3, 2000)
 Fewest points scored: 2, Queensland d. New South Wales 2–0 (match 1, 1995)
 Total points scored: 1940 Queensland, 1836 New South Wales 
 Most consecutive wins: 8, Queensland (match 2, 1987 – match 3, 1989)
 New South Wales wins: 54
 Queensland wins: 63
 Drawn matches: 2
 Largest winning margin: 46, Queensland d. New South Wales 52–6 (Match 3, 2015)
 Highest score: 56, New South Wales d. Queensland 56–16 (Match 3, 2000)

Grounds
Since 1988 either New South Wales or Queensland usually hosts two of the three matches on a rotational basis. Prior to this Queensland hosted two matches every year. In 1990, 1994, 1995, 1997, 2006, 2009, 2012, 2015 and 2018 one of the matches was played in Melbourne. The following venues have hosted State of Origin matches since 1980.

Players

Individual records
Most tries in a match: 3 – Chris Anderson (Game 3, 1983), Kerry Boustead (Game 1, 1984), Ryan Girdler (Game 3, 2000), Lote Tuqiri (Game 2, 2002), Matt Sing (Game 3, 2003), Matt King (Game 3, 2005), Dane Gagai (Game 2, 2016), Valentine Holmes (Game 3, 2017), Tom Trbojevic (Game 2, 2019), Tom Trbojevic (Game 1, 2021) .
Most goals in a match: 10 – Ryan Girdler (Game 3, 2000)
Most field goals in a match: 2 – Ben Elias (Game 3, 1994)
Most points in a match: 32 – Ryan Girdler (Game 3, 2000)
Most appearances: 42 – Cameron Smith (2003–2017) 
Most consecutive matches: 36 – Johnathan Thurston (Game 1, 2005 – Game 3, 2016)
Most tries in State of Origin career: 18 – Greg Inglis (2006–2018) 
Most points in State of Origin career: 212 (5 tries, 102 goals, 2 field goals) – Johnathan Thurston (2005–2017) 
Oldest player: Petero Civoniceva (36 years and 73 days – Game 3, 2012)
Youngest player: Ben Ikin (18 years and 83 days – Game 1, 1995)
Most wins as a player: Cameron Smith 27 games to Game III 2017

Most Appearances

Queensland
42 – Cameron Smith (2003–2017)
37 – Johnathan Thurston (2005–2017) 
36 – Darren Lockyer (1998–2007, 2009–2011)
34 – Allan Langer (1987–1994, 1996, 1998, 2001–2002) 
33 – Petero Civoniceva (2001–2012)
32 – Mal Meninga (1980–1986, 1989–1994) 
32 – Nate Myles (2006–2017)
32 – Greg Inglis (2006–2018) 
31 – Wally Lewis (1980–1991)
29 – Steve Price (1998–2000, 2002–2009)
29 – Sam Thaiday (2006–2017)
29 – Billy Slater (2004–2005, 2008–2015, 2017)
28 – Darius Boyd (2008–2017)
26 – Dale Shearer (1985–1987, 1989–1993, 1995–1996) 
25 – Bob Lindner (1984–1993)

New South Wales
31 – Brad Fittler (1990–1996, 1998–2001, 2004)
27 – Andrew Ettingshausen (1987–1994, 1996, 1998)
24 – Paul Gallen (2006–2016)
23 – Laurie Daley (1989–1994, 1996, 1998–1999)
23 – Andrew Johns (1995–2000, 2002–2003, 2005)
22 – Rod Wishart (1990–1998)
22 – Jarryd Hayne (2007–2014, 2017)
21 – Danny Buderus (2002–2008)
21 – Steven Menzies (1995–1998, 2001–2002, 2005–2006)
21 – Tim Brasher (1992–1998, 2000)
20 – Paul Harragon (1992–1998) 
19 – Glenn Lazarus (1989–1994, 1996, 1998–1999)
19 – Ben Elias (1985, 1988, 1990–1994)
19 – Michael O'Connor (1985–1991)

Man of the Match awards

Wally Lewis Medal
From 1992 to 2003 the Wally Lewis Medal was awarded by the Queensland Rugby League for the Queensland player of the series. Since 2004 it has been awarded to the player of the series, irrespective of state. The following players have been awarded the Wally Lewis Medal for player of the series.

Ron McAuliffe Medal
The following players have been awarded the Ron McAuliffe Medal for Queensland player of the series. From 1992 to 2003, the award was the "Wally Lewis Medal", however after 2003, this medal was dedicated to the player of the series from both teams, and thus the award for Queensland Player of the Series was awarded with the "Ron McAuliffe" Medal.

Brad Fittler Medal
The following players have been awarded the Brad Fittler Medal for New South Wales player of the series.

New South Wales captains

Queensland captains

Coaches

New South Wales

Queensland

Referees
The following referees have controlled State of Origin series matches.

 Bill Harrigan also refereed both matches between New South Wales and Queensland in the Super League Tri-series.

 Most games in a row: 22 (Gerard Sutton)

See also

List of NRL records
List of records in the National Youth Competition (rugby league)

References

Sources
 Former Origin Greats (FOGS) website
 World of Rugby League website
State of Origin Past Series Winners at australianrugbyleague.com.au

External links
State of Origin records at nswrl.com
RL1908's State of Origin All-time Statistics
 stateoforigin.com.au Official state of origin website
State of Origin at Rugby League Tables
State of Origin at rugbyleagueproject.com

Rugby League State of Origin
Australian rugby league lists
Rugby league records and statistics